Luv Films is an Indian film production company founded by childhood friends Luv Ranjan and Ankur Garg. Based in Mumbai, Luv Films produces and distributes features films and within a short span of time has established itself as one of the prominent producers in the Hindi film industry.

Establishment 

Luv Films was founded in 2021 by Luv Ranjan, screenwriter & director of De De Pyaar De Tu Jhoothi main Makkar Ankur Garg, While Luv is the creative force of the company, Ankur handles the business reigns.

Production ventures

Luv Films 

Luv Films co-produced their first film Sonu Ke Titu Ki Sweety, a romantic comedy directed by Luv Ranjan starring Kartik Aaryan, Nushrat Bharucha and Sunny Singh that released on 23 February 2018. The film received positive reviews and went on to becoming a blockbuster with its lifetime collection being more than ₹100 crore on the Indian box office.

In 2019, Luv Films produced  De De Pyaar De, starring Ajay Devgn, Tabu and Rakul Preet Singh in lead roles which released on 17 May 2019. The film was the directorial debut of the well-known film editor Akiv Ali, and was written by Luv Ranjan and Tarun Jain. The romantic comedy garnered thumbs up by the audiences while the film's worldwide gross collections stood at ₹140+ crores.

Luv Films' family comedy film Jai Mummy Di starring actors Sunny Singh, Sonnalli Seygall, Supriya Pathak and Poonam Dhillon was released on 17 January 2020. The movie is directed by debutant Navjot Gulati.

In 2019, Luv Films collaborated with Mohit Suri to produce a multi starrer-revenge drama, Malang: Unleash The Madness. The film which starred Anil Kapoor, Aditya Roy Kapur, Disha Patani and Kunal Khemu was released on 7 February 2020. After a successful run the makers decided to make a sequel called Malang 2.

Luv Films released Chhalaang, a social comedy directed by Hansal Mehta starring Rajkummar Rao and Nushrat Bharucha, on 13 November 2020. The movie is now streaming on Amazon Prime Video.

Vadh starring Sanjay Mishra & Neena Gupta was released in cinemas on 9th December, 2022. It is presented by Luv Films, written & directed by Jaspal Singh Sandhu & Rajeev Barnwal & produced by J Studio & Next Level Productions.

Luv Films and Vishal Bhardwaj Films announced their first collaboration to produce ‘Kuttey’, presented by T-Series. The film marks the directorial debut of Aasmaan Bhardwaj. Its stellar cast consists of Arjun Kapoor, Konkona Sen Sharma, Naseeruddin Shah, Kumud Mishra, Radhika Madan, Shardul Bhardwaj and Tabu. Written by Aasmaan and Vishal Bhardwaj, ‘Kuttey’ is a caper-thriller was released in cinemas on 13th January 2023.

Luv Films announced a Ranbir Kapoor and Shraddha Kapoor starrer, Tu Jhoothi Main Makkaar, to be directed by Luv Ranjan in 2019 which was released on Holi 2023, 8 March.

Upcoming films  

Luv Films has announced an upcoming attractions which is a biopic on a renowned Indian Cricketer, former India Captain and BCCI President Sourav Ganguly.

The Lazy Studio 

The Lazy Studio was formed under the aegis of Luv Films, to produce digital content. Under this, a digital sitcom Life Sahi Hai was created. The first season was released on YouTube. In 2018, the sitcom was renewed for a second season and released on Zee5.

Filmography

Production

References 

Indian companies established in 2012